Strictly Come Dancing Live! (also known as Strictly Come Dancing: The Live Tour!) is a nationwide arena tour in the United Kingdom which was first staged in 2008 and has continued every year since. It is directed and co-choreographed by Strictly Come Dancing judge Craig Revel Horwood.

Main tour

Presenters

The Live Tour! 2008
Strictly Come Dancing went on tour at the beginning of 2008 for the first time. The tour was hosted by Kate Thornton, and judged by Craig Revel Horwood, Arlene Phillips, and Len Goodman. Bruno Tonioli was not a judge in this competition due to him being in Los Angeles. The tour began on 18 January 2008 in Glasgow and finished on 19 February 2008 in Birmingham.

Celebrity dancers taking part were:
Series 1 runner-up Christopher Parker and Nicole Cutler – Tango & Paso Doble
Series 2 runner-up Denise Lewis and Matthew Cutler – Quickstep & Rumba
Series 3 winner Darren Gough and Lilia Kopylova – Foxtrot & Paso Doble
Series 3 contestant James Martin/Series 1 contestant Martin Offiah and Camilla Dallerup – Waltz & Cha Cha Cha
Series 5 contestant Letitia Dean and Darren Bennett – Foxtrot & Jive
Series 4 contestant Louisa Lytton and Vincent Simone – Argentine Tango & Jive
Series 5 runner-up Matt Di Angelo and Flavia Cacace – American Smooth & Salsa
Series 3 finalist Zoë Ball and Ian Waite – Tango & Samba

Christopher Parker's original partner Hanna Karttunen did not dance with him as she had left the show before this tour. Denise Lewis also had a different partner as her original partner Ian Waite danced with more recent partner Zoë Ball, instead, she danced with Matthew Cutler. Also, when James Martin was unavailable for some dates, Martin Offiah stepped in to partner Camilla Dallerup.

Strictly professionals James Jordan and Ola Jordan also performed a routine together.

The results of the tour are as follows:

Denise Lewis, Christopher Parker or James Martin were not winners or runners up at any stage of the tour.

The Live Tour! 2009
The Strictly Come Dancing Tour returned in January and February 2009. Kate Thornton returned to host, and all four judges from the TV series took part.

Celebrity dancers taking part were:
Series 6 contestant Cherie Lunghi and James Jordan – American Smooth & Rumba
Series 5 semi-finalist Gethin Jones and Flavia Cacace – Waltz & Salsa
Series 2 winner Jill Halfpenny and Darren Bennett – Foxtrot & Jive
Series 6 contestant Jodie Kidd and Ian Waite – American Smooth & Jive
Series 2 finalist Julian Clary and Lilia Kopylova – Quickstep & Samba
Series 5 contestant Kenny Logan and Ola Jordan – Viennese Waltz & Paso Doble
Series 6 runner-up Rachel Stevens and Vincent Simone – Tango & Rumba
Series 6 winner Tom Chambers and Camilla Dallerup – Quickstep & Samba

The couples and results of the tour were as follows:

Gethin Jones and Julian Clary were paired with new professional partners – Jones' partner Camilla Dallerup danced with her series six celebrity Tom Chambers, whilst Clary's partner (Erin Boag) did not take part in the tour, as she and her professional partner Anton du Beke were on their own Cheek To Cheek tour of the UK.

Strictly Come Dancing professionals Matthew Cutler and Kristina Rihanoff also performed a routine together.

The DVD was released on 9 November 2009.

The Live Tour! 2010
The Strictly Come Dancing Live Tour took place in January and February 2010. Amanda Byram and Kate Thornton hosted on different nights.

The judging panel consisted of four members:
Craig Revel Horwood
Len Goodman (did not appear at every performance)
Arlene Phillips (did not appear at every performance)
Bruno Tonioli

The following celebrities and professional dancers starred in the tour:

Series 7 semi-finalist Ali Bastian and Brian Fortuna – Viennese Waltz & Samba
Series 5 contestant Kelly Brook and Matthew Cutler – Jive & American Smooth
Series 7 winner Chris Hollins and Ola Jordan – Rumba & Foxtrot
Series 4 winner Mark Ramprakash and Kristina Rihanoff – Argentine Tango & Salsa
Series 7 contestant Ricky Groves and Aliona Vilani – American Smooth & Paso Doble
Series 7 contestant Natalie Cassidy and Darren Bennett – Quickstep & Cha Cha Cha
Series 7 contestant Zöe Lucker and James Jordan – Waltz & Rumba
Series 6 contestant Austin Healey and Lilia Kopylova – Jive & Tango

Two other pro dancers danced on the tour:
 Ian Waite and Natalie Lowe

The Live Tour! 2011
The Strictly Come Dancing 2011 UK tour returned to UK arenas during January and February 2011. Zoë Ball joined as host, and Craig Revel Horwood, Bruno Tonioli and Len Goodman returned as judges. Fever Dance Company Adult Formation team trained by Rachael Holland also performed alongside the Strictly stars. The celebrities and professionals who participated were:

Series 7 runner-up Ricky Whittle and Natalie Lowe – Argentine Tango & Quickstep
Series 8 contestant Tina O'Brien and Jared Murillo – Charleston & Foxtrot
Series 8 finalist Pamela Stephenson and James Jordan – Argentine Tango & Viennese Waltz
Series 8 winner Kara Tointon and Artem Chigvintsev – Paso Doble & American Smooth
Series 3 runner-up Colin Jackson and Ola Jordan – Quickstep & Cha Cha Cha
Series 8 contestant Patsy Kensit and Robin Windsor –  Viennese Waltz & Salsa
Series 8 contestant Jimi Mistry and Kristina Rihanoff – Paso Doble & Foxtrot
Series 8 runner-up Matt Baker and Aliona Vilani – Tango & Samba
Series 8 quarter-finalist Ann Widdecombe and Craig Revel Horwood – Charleston

The Live Tour! 2012
The Strictly Come Dancing 2012 UK tour began its run on 20 January and finished on 26 February. The venues hosting the tour were:

National Indoor Arena, Birmingham
Capital FM Arena, Nottingham
Wembley Arena and O2 Arena, London
Evening News Arena, Manchester
Sheffield Arena, Sheffield
Echo Arena, Liverpool
Metro Radio Arena, Newcastle
SECC, Glasgow
Cardiff International Arena, Cardiff
The O2, Dublin
Odyssey Arena, Belfast

Kate Thornton returned as host. Craig Revel Horwood, Bruno Tonioli and Len Goodman returned as judges. Revel Horwood directed the tour for the second year.

The celebrities and professionals who participated were:

Series 9 contestant Anita Dobson and Robin Windsor – Charleston & Salsa
Series 9 runner-up Chelsee Healey and Pasha Kovalev – Showdance & Quickstep
Series 9 winner Harry Judd and Aliona Vilani – Argentine Tango & Quickstep
Series 9 finalist Jason Donovan and Kristina Rihanoff – Jive & Argentine Tango
Series 6 contestant Mark Foster and Natalie Lowe – Waltz & Cha Cha Cha
Series 9 contestant Nancy Dell'Olio and Artem Chigvintsev – Salsa & Tango
Series 9 quarter-finalist Robbie Savage and Katya Virshilas – Paso Doble & Salsa

Ian Waite performed with Natalie on the tour, but did not partner a celebrity.

The Live Tour! 2013
The Strictly Come Dancing 2013 UK tour began its run on 18 January 2013. The confirmed line-up of celebrities and professionals for the tour is as follows:

Series 10 finalist Dani Harmer and Pasha Kovalev – Tango & Charleston/Quickstep Fusion
Series 10 runner-up Denise van Outen and James Jordan – Jive & Charleston
Series 10 contestant Fern Britton and Artem Chigvintsev – Viennese Waltz & Salsa
Series 10 semi-finalist Lisa Riley and Robin Windsor – Cha Cha Cha & Foxtrot
Series 10 winner Louis Smith and Ola Jordan – Tango/Rumba Fusion & Salsa
Series 10 contestant Michael Vaughan and Natalie Lowe – Samba & American Smooth
Series 7 contestant Phil Tufnell and Karen Hauer – Salsa & American Smooth

Kate Thornton returned as host; Craig Revel Horwood, Bruno Tonioli and Len Goodman returned as judges. Iveta Lukosiute also performed on the tour, but did not partner a celebrity. Louis Smith and Ola Jordan were the overall champions of the tour, with the most wins.

The Live Tour! 2014
The Strictly Come Dancing 2014 UK Tour begun on 17 January 2014 at the National Indoor Arena in Birmingham and ended at The O2 Arena on 7 February. The tour was hosted by former contestant Lisa Riley, and Bruno Tonioli, Craig Revel Horwood and Len Goodman returned as judges.

The following celebrities and professionals took part:

 Series 11 contestant Mark Benton and Iveta Lukosiute – Salsa & Cha Cha Cha
 Series 11 contestant Ben Cohen and Kristina Rihanoff – Waltz & Salsa
 Series 11 runner-up Susanna Reid and Kevin Clifton – Foxtrot & Paso Doble
 Series 11 runner-up Natalie Gumede and Artem Chigvintsev – Viennese Waltz & Jive
 Series 11 winner Abbey Clancy and Aljaž Škorjanec – Quickstep & Salsa
 Series 11 contestant Deborah Meaden and Robin Windsor – Quickstep & Cha Cha Cha
 Series 10 quarter-finalist Nicky Byrne and Karen Hauer – Argentine Tango & Charleston

Natalie Lowe also featured on the tour, but did not partner a celebrity.

This is the first series of The Live Tour! in which all of the celebrities danced with their original partners.

The Live Tour! 2015
The Strictly Come Dancing 2015 UK Tour began on 16 January 2015 at the National Indoor Arena in Birmingham and concluded at The O2 Arena on 8 February 2015. The tour was hosted by former contestant and It Takes Two host Zoë Ball for the second time. Craig Revel Horwood returned as judge, but Len Goodman and Bruno Tonioli did not take part due to other commitments including Dancing with the Stars in the United States, so they were replaced by Series 6 champion Tom Chambers and his professional partner Camilla Dallerup. Anton du Beke was also a judge in the Echo Arena, Liverpool and Wembley Arena, London. Len Goodman was a judge just for the O2 show on 8 February and on that same show the presenter was Lisa Riley.

The following celebrities and professionals took part:

 Series 12 contestant Thom Evans and Iveta Lukosiute – Charleston & Salsa
 Series 12 winner Caroline Flack and Tristan MacManus – American Smooth & Charleston
 Series 12 contestant Alison Hammond and Aljaž Skorjanec – Charleston & Cha Cha Cha
 Series 12 contestant Scott Mills and Joanne Clifton – Foxtrot & Samba
 Series 12 runner-up Simon Webbe and Kristina Rihanoff – Salsa & Argentine Tango
 Series 12 finalist Mark Wright and Karen Hauer – Cha Cha Cha & Foxtrot
 Series 6 runner-up Rachel Stevens and Kevin Clifton – Tango & Rumba

Trent Whiddon also featured on the tour to dance with Iveta, but did not partner a celebrity.

Simon Webbe and Kristina Rihanoff were the overall champions of the tour, with the most wins.

Pro partners on the tour were as follows:
 Kevin Clifton and Karen Clifton
 Tristan MacManus and Kristina Rihanoff
 Aljaz Skorjanec and Joanne Clifton
 Trent Whiddon and Iveta Lukosiute

 Frankie Bridge was originally supposed to take part, but had to pull out due to pregnancy, so Stevens took her place.

The Live Tour! 2016
The 2016 tour started on 22 January and finished on 14 February. The new presenter was Mel Giedroyc and the judges were Craig Revel Horwood, Len Goodman and Bruno Tonioli.

 Series 13 contestant Ainsley Harriott and Karen Clifton – Tango & Salsaa
 Series 12 runner-up Frankie Bridge and Kevin Clifton – Quickstep & Tango
 Series 13 runner-up Georgia May Foote and Giovanni Pernice – Charleston & American Smooth
 Series 13 semi-finalist Anita Rani and Gleb Savchenko – Paso Doble & American Smoothb
 Series 13 winner Jay McGuiness and Aliona Vilani – Rumba & Jive
 Series 13 quarter-finalist Helen George and Aljaž Skorjanec – Viennese Waltz & Tango
 Series 12 semi-finalist Jake Wood and Janette Manrara – Salsa & Samba

Joanne Clifton was also featured on the tour, but did not partner a celebrity.

Pro Partners on the tour were as follows:

 Kevin Clifton and Karen Clifton
 Giovanni Pernice and Aliona Vilani
 Aljaz Skorjanec and Janette Manrara
 Gleb Savchenko and Joanne Clifton

a Natalie Lowe was scheduled to dance on the tour but she sustained an injury during tour rehearsals. Karen Clifton, who was already set to dance on the tour without a celebrity partner, took over for Lowe.

b Mel Giedroyc was ill on 9 February so Anita Rani hosted instead. However, she still performed her Paso Doble but not for votes.

The Live Tour! 2017
The 2017 tour was presented by 2015 semi-finalist Anita Rani. The judges were Craig Revel Horwood, Len Goodman and Karen Hardy. The tour started on 20 January and finished on 12 February.

The full tour line up was announced on 14 December:

 Series 14 runner-up Louise Redknapp and Kevin Clifton – Paso Doble & Quickstep
 Series 14 contestant Daisy Lowe and Aljaž Skorjanec – Salsa & Waltz
 Series 14 runner-up Danny Mac and Oti Mabuse – Charleston & Samba
 Series 14 contestant Ed Balls and Katya Jones – American Smooth & Salsa
 Series 14 winner Ore Oduba and Karen Clifton – Jive & Showdance
 Series 14 contestant Lesley Joseph and Gorka Márquez – Quickstep & Charleston

As Ed Balls was not available to dance in Manchester, Judge Rinder and Oksana Platero replaced him for the 4 and 5 February performances and danced the Jive and the Cha Cha Cha.

Extra Dancers on Tour who were dancing in Group Dances:
 Giovanni Pernice and Janette Manrara
 AJ Pritchard and Chloe Hewitt
 Neil Jones and Oksana Platero

The Live Tour! 2018
The 2018 tour was presented by 2016 champion Ore Oduba. The judges were Craig Revel Horwood, Bruno Tonioli and Darcey Bussell. The tour started on 19 January and finished on 11 February.

The full tour line up was announced on 14 December:

 Series 15 runner-up Alexandra Burke and Gorka Márquez – Quickstep & Jive
 Series 15 runner-up Debbie McGee and Giovanni Pernice – Salsa & American Smooth
 Series 15 runner-up Gemma Atkinson and Aljaž Skorjanec – Paso Doble & American Smooth
 Series 15 winner Joe McFadden and Katya Jones – Argentine Tango & Charleston
 Series 15 quarter-finalist Davood Ghadami and Nadiya Bychkova – Charleston & Paso Doble
 Series 15 contestant Susan Calman and Kevin Clifton – Samba & Quickstep
 Series 15 contestant Jonnie Peacock and Oti Mabuse – Jive & American Smooth

Extra dancers who were also on the tour: Dianne Buswell, Amy Dowden, Janette Manrara, AJ Pritchard, Chloe Hewitt and Neil Jones

The Live Tour! 2019
2016 champion Ore Oduba returned as the host, and Shirley Ballas joined Craig Revel Horwood, Darcey Bussell and Bruno Tonioli on the judging panel. The tour started on 18 January and ended on 10 February.

The line-up for the tour was announced on 10 December:

Series 16 winner Stacey Dooley and Aljaž Skorjanec – American Smooth & Paso Doble
Series 16 runner-up Faye Tozer and Giovanni Pernice – Showdance & Charleston
Series 16 runner-up Joe Sugg and Dianne Buswell – Showdance & Charleston 
Series 16 runner-up Ashley Roberts and Pasha Kovalev – Jive & American Smooth
Series 16 semi-finalist Lauren Steadman and AJ Pritchard – Jive & Viennese Waltz
Series 16 contestant Graeme Swann and Karen Clifton – Samba & Jazz
Series 16 contestant Dr. Ranj Singh and Janette Manrara – Cha Cha Cha & Salsa

Additional professional dancers on the tour were Nadiya Bychkova, Graziano Di Prima, Amy Dowden, Jake Leigh, Luba Mushtuk and Johannes Radebe.

Joe Sugg and Dianne Buswell made Strictly Live Tour history by winning 25 shows in a row, later becoming the overall tour winners.

The Live Tour! 2020
The 2020 tour was hosted by Series 16 winner Stacey Dooley. Craig Revel Horwood, Shirley Ballas and Bruno Tonioli formed the judging panel. The tour started on 16 January and ended on 9 February.

The tour featured the following couples performing two of their dances from Series 17:
Series 17 winner Kelvin Fletcher and Janette Manrara – Showdance & Samba
Series 17 runner-up Emma Barton and Graziano Di Prima – Charleston & American Smooth
Series 17 runner-up Karim Zeroual and Amy Dowden – Quickstep & Jive
Series 17 quarter-finalist Alex Scott and Neil Jones – Paso Doble & Street
Series 17 contestant Saffron Barker and AJ Pritchard – Foxtrot & Waltz
Series 17 contestant Mike Bushell and Katya Jones – Cha Cha Cha & Quickstep
Series 17 contestant Catherine Tyldesley and Johannes Radebe – Rumba & Charleston

Due to an injury, Catherine Tyldesley was forced to pull out of the Tour on 30 January.

Additional professional dancers on the tour were Dianne Buswell, Karen Hauer, Luba Mushtuk, Joshua Keefe, Robbie Kmetoni, and Jake Leigh.

Relaxed performance
On 2 October 2019, it was announced that during one of the shows, Strictly Come Dancing Live would be working with the National Autistic Society on their first ever relaxed performance at Motorpoint Arena Nottingham.

The Live Tour! 2022
The 2021 tour was cancelled due to the COVID-19 pandemic. The 2022 tour was announced in October 2020, and began on 20 January 2022 in Birmingham for 33 shows with Janette Manrara as host and Craig Revel Horwood, Shirley Ballas and Bruno Tonioli forming the judges panel.

The tour features (in running order):
Series 19 runner-up John Whaite and Johannes Radebe – Paso Doble & Showdance 
Series 19 contestant Tilly Ramsay and Nikita Kuzmin – Waltz & Couple's Choice
Series 18 contestant Max George and Katya Jones – Jive & American Smooth
Series 19 contestant Sara Davies and Aljaž Skorjanec – Foxtrot & Quickstep
Series 18 runner-up Maisie Smith and Kai Widdrington – Quickstep & Samba
Series 19 semi-finalist Rhys Stephenson and Nancy Xu – Charleston & Argentine Tango  
Series 19 winner Rose Ayling-Ellis and Giovanni Pernice – Argentine Tango & Couple's Choice

Series 19 finalist AJ Odudu was originally scheduled to take part in the tour, but was forced to pull out due to the ankle injury she suffered on the show; she was replaced by Series 18 runner-up Maisie Smith.

Pro Nikita Kuzmin was forced to miss the beginning of the tour due to testing positive for COVID-19; his partner Tilly Ramsay danced with Neil Jones until Kuzmin returned to the tour on 25 January.

Rhys Stephenson did not dance in Sheffield on 1 February for undisclosed reasons.

John Whaite did not dance in Glasgow on 6 February due to testing positive for COVID-19 on a lateral flow test. A subsequent PCR test came back negative, and he performed in Glasgow the following evening.

Additional professional dancers on the tour are Amy Dowden, Cameron Lombard, Jake Leigh, Jowita Przystal, Luba Mushtuk, Nadiya Bychkova, and Neil Jones.

The Live Tour! 2023

The 2023 tour was once again hosted by Janette Manrara. Anton du Beke joined Craig Revel Horwood and Shirley Ballas on the judging panel. The tour began on 20 January and will end on 12 February.

The tour features (in running order):
Series 20 contestant Tyler West and Dianne Buswell – Charleston & Salsa
Series 20 runner-up Molly Rainford and Carlos Gu – Quickstep & Paso Doble
Series 20 semi-finalist Will Mellor and Nancy Xu – Jive & American Smooth
Series 20 contestant Ellie Simmonds and Nikita Kuzmin – Waltz & Charleston
Series 20 runner-up Helen Skelton and Kai Widdrington – Quickstep & Couple's Choice
Series 20 runner-up Fleur East and Vito Coppola –  Samba & Couple's Choice
Series 20 winner Hamza Yassin and Jowita Przystał – American Smooth & Salsa

Fleur East did not dance in Newcastle on 2 February and London on 3 February for undisclosed reasons.

Tyler West did not dance in Glasgow on 10 February due to illness.

Additional professional dancers on the tour were Amy Dowden, Neil Jones, Robbie Kmetoni, Jake Leigh, Luba Mushtuk and Michelle Tsiakkas.

The Professionals Tour

The Professionals Tour 2010
The first Professionals Tour was in 2010. Nine professional dancers took part in the tour between April and July 2010. It featured:

Vincent Simone and Flavia Cacace
Matthew Cutler and Aliona Vilani
James Jordan and Ola Jordan
Brian Fortuna and Kristina Rihanoff
Ian Waite

The Professionals Tour 2019
Strictly Come Dancing – The Professionals Tour returned in 2019 and ran between 3 May and 2 June. It featured the following Professionals:

AJ Pritchard
Dianne Buswell
Giovanni Pernice
Gorka Márquez
Karen Clifton
Katya Jones
Nadiya Bychkova
Neil Jones
Oti Mabuse
Pasha Kovalev

The Professionals Tour 2021 (cancelled)
It had been announced that The Professionals Tour would return again in 2020 following the success of the 2019 tour. This was later postponed to 2021, and then 2022, as a result of the COVID-19 pandemic. The 2021 tour would have featured the following ten professional dancers:

Dianne Buswell
Gorka Márquez
Janette Manrara
Johannes Radebe
Joshua Keefe
Kai Widdrington
Karen Hauer
Katya Jones
Luba Mushtuk
Neil Jones

The Professionals Tour 2022
The 2022 tour ran between 28 April and 30 May and featured the following ten professional dancers:

Cameron Lombard
Dianne Buswell
Gorka Márquez
Graziano Di Prima
Kai Widdrington
Karen Hauer
Katya Jones
Luba Mushtuk
Nadiya Bychkova
Neil Jones

The Professionals Tour 2023
The 2023 tour will run between 2 May and 31 May and will feature the following ten professional dancers:

Carlos Gu
Dianne Buswell
Gorka Márquez
Jowita Przystał
Karen Hauer
Luba Mushtuk
Nancy Xu
Neil Jones
Nikita Kuzmin
Vito Coppola

References

External links

Tour
Touring performing arts
Recurring events established in 2008